Floda BoIF is a Swedish football club located in Floda, Lerum, near Gothenburg.

Background
Since their foundation on 11 February 1935 Floda Boll-och Idrottsförening has participated mainly in the middle and lower divisions of the Swedish football league system.  The club currently plays in Division 4 Göteborg A, which is the sixth tier of Swedish football, following two successive relegations in 2006 and 2007. They play their home matches at the Flodala IP in Floda.

Floda BoIF are affiliated to the Göteborgs Fotbollförbund. Floda BoIF have competed in the Svenska Cupen on 17 occasions and have played 33 matches in the competition. They played in the 2003 Svenska Cupen and reached the second round when they lost 1–9 at home to Örgryte IS.

Season to season

Attendances

In recent seasons Floda BoIF have had the following average attendances:

Footnotes

External links
  Floda BoIF – Official website

Football clubs in Västra Götaland County
Association football clubs established in 1935
1935 establishments in Sweden